Thomas or Tom Steele may refer to:

 Thomas Steele (Australian politician) (1887–1963), member of the New South Wales Legislative Council
 Thomas Steele (British politician) (1753–1823), English Member of Parliament
 Thomas Steele (VC) (1891–1978), English recipient of the Victoria Cross
 Thomas Steele (innkeeper) (1806–1877), English-born innkeeper and namesake of Steeles Avenue in Toronto and York Region
 Thomas J. Steele (1853–1920), American politician, U.S. Representative from Iowa
 Thomas Montagu Steele (1820–1890), British army officer
 Tom Steele (politician) (1905–1979), Scottish Labour politician
 Tom Steele (stuntman) (1909–1990), American stuntman and actor
 Tommy Steele (born 1936), English entertainer

See also
 Tommy Steel, soccer goalkeeper